The 2015 League of Ireland First Division season was the 31st season of the League of Ireland First Division. The First Division was contested by eight teams. Wexford Youths won the title and Finn Harps were also promoted after winning a play off.

Teams

Stadia and locations

Personnel and kits
Note: Flags indicate national team as has been defined under FIFA eligibility rules. Players may hold more than one non-FIFA nationality.

Overview

The 2015 First Division featured eight teams. Each team played each other four times, twice at home and twice away, for a total of 28 matches during the season.
Wexford Youths secured their first League of Ireland First Division title and promotion to the Premier Division with a 3–0 victory against Athlone Town  at Ferrycarrig Park. The Youths goals came from Danny Furlong, Eric Molloy and Aidan Keenan.

Final table

Results

Matches 1–14

Matches 15–28

Top scorers

Promotion/relegation playoffs
The second and third placed First Division teams, Finn Harps and UCD, played off to decide who would play Limerick, the eleventh placed team from the Premier Division. The winner of this play off would play in the 2016 Premier Division.
First Division 

Finn Harps won 3 – 1 on aggregate
First Division v Premier Division  

Finn Harps won 2–1 on aggregate and were promoted to 2016 Premier Division. Limerick are relegated to the 2016 First Division.

See also
 2015 League of Ireland Premier Division
 2015 League of Ireland Cup

References

 
League of Ireland First Division seasons
2015 League of Ireland
2015 in Republic of Ireland association football leagues
Ireland
Ireland